The Seminole siltsnail or Seminole spring snail, scientific name Floridobia vanhyningi, is a species of small freshwater snail, an aquatic gastropod mollusk in the family Hydrobiidae. This species is endemic to Seminole Springs in Florida, United States.

References

Molluscs of the United States
Floridobia
Hydrobiidae
Taxonomy articles created by Polbot